Jordan is a given name and a surname.

The form found in Western names originates from the Hebrew  Yarden, meaning "to go down", relating to the Jordan River in Israel. According to the New Testament of the Bible, John the Baptist baptised Jesus Christ in the Jordan, and during the Crusades, crusaders and pilgrims would bring back some of the river water in containers to use in the baptism of their own children in Europe and Britain. It thus became popular as a first name. The Germanic name Jordanes, which was the name of a 6th-century Gothic historian, may have popularised the name as well.

The Greek form is Ἰορδάνης (Iordanes), in Arabic it is Al-Urdunn, in Latin Jordanus, in Italian Giordano, in Spanish Jordán, in Portuguese Jordão, in German Jordan, in Dutch Jordaan, in French Jourdain, in Irish Iordáin or Riordan, in Romanian Iordan, in Bulgarian Йордан (Yordan) and in Catalan Jordà.

The English form of the name appears to have died out after medieval times, but started to be used again the 19th century, becoming especially popular in the U.S. and some other countries in the latter half of the 20th century.

Jordan is used as either a given name or a surname. Until the late 1970s, "Jordan" was predominantly used as a male name in the United States, but later began to gain popularity as a female name as well. As of 2006, males accounted for 72.5% of people with this name in that country.

Notable people and characters with the name include:

Christianity
Jordan of Bristol, saint venerated in Bristol, England   
Jordan (Bishop of Poland) (died 982 or 984), first Bishop of Poland   
Jordan of Clivio (died 1120), Archbishop of Milan   
Jordan of Saxony (died 1237), Dominican master general
Jordan of Santa Susanna (died after 1154), French cardinal and papal legate
Jordan Catalani (died 1330), Dominican missionary and explorer   
Raymond Jordan (fl. c. 1381), monk and author
Jordan of Pisa (also known as Jordan of Rivalto, c. 1255 – 1311), monk, academic and theologian
Samuel M. Jordan (1871–1952), American Presbyterian missionary in Persia
Francis Mary of the Cross Jordan (1848–1918), Roman Catholic priest and the founder of the Salvatorian order

Nobility
Jordan I of Capua (died 1091), Prince of Capua
Jordan of Hauteville (died 1092), Count of Syracuse
Jordan II of Capua (died 1127), Prince of Capua
Jordan of Ariano (died 1127), Norman count
Jordan Pierleoni, leader of the Commune of Rome
Jordan de Exeter (died 1258), Anglo-Norman knight, fought at First Battle of Athenry, Sheriff of Connaught
Jordan Lancia (died 1268), Italian victor of the Battle of Montaperti
Jordan IV of L'Isle-Jourdain (died 1288), French crusader
Jordan Óge de Exeter (died 1319), Anglo-Irish sheriff

Politics
Barbara Jordan (1936–1996), U.S. Representative from Texas
B. Everett Jordan (1896–1974), U.S. Senator from North Carolina
Christina Jordan (born 1962), British politician
Daphne Jordan (born 1959), American politician serving in the New York State Senate
Hamilton Jordan (1944–2008), advisor to American President Jimmy Carter
Jim Jordan (born 1964), United States Representative from Ohio
Kris Jordan (1977-2023), American politician
Leon Jordan (1905–1970), American politician who served in the Missouri House of Representatives
Orchid I. Jordan (1910–1995), American politician who served in the Missouri House of Representatives
Raymond A. Jordan (1943-2022), American politician
Ricardo López Jordán (1822–1889), Argentinean political and military figure
Robert Jordan (lawyer) (born 1945), American lawyer and former diplomat
Vernon Jordan (1935–2021), American lawyer and business executive
Wilhelm Jordan (writer) (1819–1904), German writer and politician

Music

Surname
Alexis Jordan (born 1992), American singer and actress
Angelina Jordan (born 2006), Norwegian child singer who won the 2014 season of Norway´s Got Talent
Armin Jordan (1932–2006), Swiss conductor
Benn Jordan (born 1978), American musician
David Jordan (singer) (born 1985), English singer-songwriter
Frankie Jordan (born 1938), French pop singer
Jeremy Jordan (disambiguation)
Leroy "Lonnie" Jordan (born 1948), founding member of American band War
Louis Jordan (1908–1975), African-American musician and songwriter
Montell Jordan (born 1968), American R&B singer-songwriter and record producer
Ronny Jordan (born 1962), British musician
Steve Jordan (disambiguation)

Given name
Jordan Terrell Carter (born 1996), American rapper-songwriter
Jordan Jenks (born 1993), Belizean-American rapper, record producer, and songwriter
Jordan Knight (born 1970), American pop singer (New Kids on the Block)
Jordan Kyle, American songwriter and producer
Jordan Luck (b. ca 1961), New Zealand musician
Jordan Maron (born 1992), American electronic music producer
Jordan North (born 1990), English radio DJ
Jordan Officer (born 1976), Canadian jazz/blues/country musician
Jordan Pruitt (born 1991), American pop singer
Jordan Raycroft (born 1991), Canadian singer-songwriter
Jordan Rudess (born 1956), American keyboardist (Dream Theater)
Jordin Sparks (born 1989), American singer 
Jordan Waring (born 1964), American symphonic composer and banker
Jordan White (musician) (born 1980), American rock musician

Literature

Surname
Brent Jordan (born 1963), American writer and strip-club bouncer
Cornelia Jane Matthews Jordan (1830–1898), American poet, lyricist
Robert Jordan (1948–2007), American fantasy author

Given name
Jordan of Osnabrück (c. 1220 – 1284), German political writer
Jordan Belfort (born 1962), American author of The Wolf of Wall Street
Jordan Bonel (fl. late 12th century), French troubadour
Jordan Fantosme (died c. 1185), Anglo-Norman poet and historian
Jordan Ifueko (born 1993), Nigerian American writer
Jordan Sonnenblick (born 1969), American writer

Science 
Camille Jordan (1838–1922), French mathematician
Claude Thomas Alexis Jordan (1847–1897), French botanist and taxonomist
David Starr Jordan (1851–1931), American biologist
Denis Jordan (1914–1982), Australian chemist
Edwin Oakes Jordan (1866–1936), American bacteriologist and public health scientist
 Heinrich Ernst Karl Jordan (1861–1959), German entomologist
Henryk Jordan (1842–1907), Polish physician and philanthropist
Johann Christoph Jordan (died 1748), German writer on the history of the Slavic peoples
Jordan Peterson (born 1962), Canadian psychologist
Michael I. Jordan (born 1956), American researcher in machine learning and artificial intelligence
Pascual Jordan (1902–1980), German theoretical and mathematical physicist
Thomas Brown Jordan (1807–1890), British inventor and mechanical engineer
V. Craig Jordan, British and American pharmacologist
Wilhelm Jordan (geodesist) (1842–1899), German geodesist

Sports

Surname
Andy Jordan (footballer born 1979), Scottish footballer
Brevin Jordan (born 2000), American football player
Brian Jordan, American professional baseball player
Chris Jordan (cricketer) (born 1988), English cricketer
Cameron Jordan (born 1989), American football player
DeAndre Jordan (born 1988), American basketball player
Eddie Jordan (born 1948), Irish automobile racer
Eddie Jordan (basketball) (born 1955), American basketball coach
Frank Jordan (footballer) (1883–1938), English footballer
Fred Jordan (baseball coach), American college baseball coach
George Jordan (footballer), Scottish footballer
Gerard Jordan, Northern Irish actor
Jason Jordan (born 1988), American professional wrestler
Joe Jordan (footballer) (born 1951), Scottish footballer and football manager
Johnny Jordan (rugby league), English rugby league footballer of the 1930s
Johnny Jordan, English footballer
Jeffrey Jordan, American basketball player
Jerome Jordan, American basketball player
Lamont Jordan, American football player
Lena Jordan, Russian gymnast
Lino Jordan, Italian biathlete and ski mountaineer
Michael Jordan (disambiguation), multiple people
Ola Jordan, Polish dancer
Orlando Jordan, American wrestler
Philip Jordan, Irish footballer
Richard Jordan (American football) (born 1972), American football player
Robert F. Jordan, American bridge player
Savannah Jordan (born 1995), American soccer player
Scott Jordan (footballer) (born 1975), English footballer
Stephen Jordan (born 1982), English footballer
Todd Jordan (born 1970), American football player
Ty Jordan (2001–2020), American football player
Willie Jordan (1885–1949), English footballer

Given name
Jordan Adams (born 1994), American basketball player
Jordan Akins (born 1992), American football player
Jordan Barnett (disambiguation), multiple people
Jordan Battle (born 2000), American football player
Jordan Berry (born 1991), Australian NFL football player
Jordan Binnington (born 1993), Canadian ice hockey player
Jordan Bone (born 1997), American basketball player
Jordan Bowers (born 2003), American gymnast
Jordan Brailford (born 1995), American football player
Jordan Brown (Australian soccer) (born 1996), Australian footballer 
Jordan Brown (American football) (born 1997), American football player
 Jordan Brown (born 1994), English-born Hong Kong professional footballer 
Jordan Burrow (born 1992), English footballer
Jordin Canada (born 1995), American basketball player
Jordan Caroline (born 1996), American basketball player
Jordan Carrell (born 1994), American football player
Jordan Chiles (born 2001), American gymnast
Jordan Cila (born 1982), American Major League Soccer midfielder
Jordan Chunn (born 1995), American football player
Jordan Cohen (born 1997), American-Israeli basketball player in the Israel Basketball Premier League
Jordan da Costa (1932–2012), Brazilian footballer
Jordan Dangerfield (born 1990), American NFL football player
Jordan Davis (American football) (born 2000), American football player
Jordan Drew (born 1995), Australian Rugby League player
Jordan Eberle (born 1990), Canadian hockey player
Jordan Elliott (born 1997), American football player
Jordan Evans (American football) (born 1995), American football player
Jordan Farmar (born 1986), American basketball player
Jordan Ford (born 1998), American basketball player
Jordan Franks (born 1996), American football player
Jordan Fuller (born 1998), American football player
Jordan Glasgow (born 1996), American football player
Jordan Goddard, English footballer
Jordan Gruber (born 1983), American-Israeli soccer player
Jordan Hamilton (born 1990), American basketball player in the Israel Basketball Premier League
Jordan Hamilton (soccer) (born 1996), Canadian soccer player
Jordan Hart (born 1995), Welsh badminton player
Jordan Haynes (born 1996), Canadian soccer player
Jordan Henderson (born 1990), English footballer
Jordan Hill (basketball) (born 1987), American basketball player
Jordan Howard (born 1994), American football player
Jordan Hulls (born 1990), American basketball player
Jordan Jackson (American football) (born 1998), American football player
Jordan Kahu (born 1991), New Zealand Rugby League player
Jordan Kunaszyk (born 1996), American football player
Jordan Larson (born 1986), American volleyball player
Jordan Lasley (born 1996), American football player
Jordan Leggett (born 1995), American football player
Jordan Leslie (born 1991), American football player
Jordan Love (born 1998), American football player
Jordan Lyles (born 1990), American baseball player
Jordan Mailata (born 1997), Samoan-Australian American football player
Jordan Mason (born 1999), American football player
Jordan McRae (born 1991), American basketball player for Hapoel Tel Aviv of the Israeli Basketball Premier League
Jordan Miller (disambiguation), multiple people
Jordan Morgan (American football) (born 1994), American football player
Jordan Murrell (born 1993), Canadian soccer player
Jordan Nobbs (born 1992), English FA Women's Super League footballer for Arsenal
Jordan Nwora (born 1998), Nigerian-American basketball player
Jordan Pacheco (born 1986), American baseball player
Jordan Parks (born 1994), American basketball player
Jordan Payton (born 1993), American football player
Jordan Pickford (born 1994), English footballer
Jordan Poole (born 1999), American basketball player
Jordan Poyer (born 1991), American football player
Jordan Rodgers (born 1988), American football player
Jordan Sakho (born 1997), Congolese basketball player
Jordan Scarlett (American football) (born 1996), American football player
Jordan Schafer (born 1986), American baseball player
Jordan Shipley (born 1985), American football player
Jordan Simmons (born 1994), American football player
Jordan Spence (born 1990), English footballer
Jordan Spieth (born 1993), American professional golfer
Jordan Staal (born 1988), Canadian hockey player
Jordan Stout (born 1998), American football player
Jordan Ta'amu (born 1997), American football player
 Jordan Tang (born 1995), Hong Kong badminton player
Jordan Theodore (born 1989), American basketball player
Jordan Thomas (American football) (born 1996), American football player
Jordan Thompson (rugby league) (born 1991), English rugby league player
Jordan Thompson (American football) (born 1989), American football player
Jordan Thompson (tennis) (born 1994), Australian tennis player
Jordan Thompson (cricketer) (born 1996), English Cricket player
Jordin Tootoo (born 1983), Canadian hockey player
Jordan Turner-Hall (born 1988), English rugby union player
Jordan Veasy (born 1995), American football player
Jordan Watson (born 1987), English kickboxer
Jordan Whitehead (born 1997), American football player
Jordan Wilkins (born 1994), American football player
Jordan Williams (American football) (born 1993), American football player
Jordan Williams (basketball, born 1990), American basketball player
Jordan Williams (footballer, born 1995) (born 1995), Welsh footballer
Jordan Williams (rugby union) (born 1993), Welsh rugby union player
Jordan Willis (American football) (born 1995), American football player
Yarden Gerbi (born 1989), nicknamed "Jordan," Israeli judoka world champion

Television
Charlotte Jordan (born 1994), English actress who has starred on Free Rein and Coronation Street
Olivia Jordan (born 1988), American actress and model
Sharon Jordan (born 1960), American film and television actress, recurred on Disney's The Suite Life of Zack & Cody
Tom Jordan (1937–2019), Irish actor noted for three decades of work on Fair City
Tony Jordan (born 1957), British television writer
Jordan Hayes (born 1987), Canadian television actress
Jordan Lloyd (born 1986), American reality television participant
Jordan Renzo (born 1993), American actor
Jordan Todosey (born 1995), Canadian television actress

Film
Leslie Jordan (1955–2022), American actor
Michael B. Jordan, American actor
Neil Jordan, Irish filmmaker
Nick Jordan, British artist filmmaker
Richard Jordan (1937–1993), American actor
Jordan Ladd, American horror actress
Jordan Nagai, American actor who played Russell in the 2009 film Up
Jordan Peele, American actor, writer and director

Other professions

Surname
Artishia Wilkerson Jordan (1901–1974), American educator and clubwoman
Dorothea Jordan (1761–1816), Irish actress and courtesan
Sir Joseph Jordan (Royal Navy officer) (c.1603–1685), English admiral
Lorna Jordan (1954–2021), American artist
Olivia Jordan (1919–2021), British driver and interpreter for Charles de Gaulle
Steven L. Jordan, American soldier who faced trial concerning the Abu Ghraib detainee-abuse scandal
Susan Jordan (born 1947), New Zealand dancer
Thomas Jordan, Swiss economist and banking supervisor

Given name
Jordan Carver (born 1986), German model and actress
Jordan "n0thing" Gilbert, American professional Counter-Strike player
Jordan Mechner, American computer-game programmer and game designer
Jordan Misja (1913–1942), Albanian communist of Serbian descent, People's Hero of Albania
Jordan Ratcliffe, English teenager who went missing in 2008
Jordan Shanks-Markinova, Australian YouTube personality known as Friendlyjordies

Fictional characters 
Jordan Baker, in the novel The Great Gatsby
Jordan Black, the daughter of main character Frank Black in the American TV series Millennium
Jordan Cavanaugh, on the television show Crossing Jordan
Jordan Catalano, portrayed by Jared Leto in the American TV series My So-Called Life
Jordan Chase, motivational speaker from the TV series Dexter
Jordan Collier, one of the central figures of the 4400 in the American TV series The 4400, portrayed by Billy Campbell
Jordan Elliot, in the novel Beach Music
Jordan James Lewis, from the family sitcom Just Jordan, portrayed by Lil' JJ
Jordan Sullivan, played by Christa Miller on the television show Scrubs
Deanna and Amy Jordyn, minor American "reality TV" stars
Hal Jordan, superhero in DC Comics, better known as Green Lantern
Lee Jordan, in the Harry Potter franchise

See also
Saint Jordan (disambiguation), saints of this name
Jordy
Jordie
Jordans (disambiguation)
Jordanus (disambiguation)
Jordanes
Jorden
Jordyn
Jourdain
Jourdan
Goran (Slavic name)
Gordan
Giordano (surname)
Iordan (disambiguation)
Riordan

References

English masculine given names
English feminine given names
Masculine given names
Feminine given names
English-language unisex given names
English-language surnames
Hebrew-language names
Modern names of Hebrew origin